The Federal Commissioner for Data Protection and Freedom of Information (BfDI), referring to either a person or the agency they lead, is tasked with supervising data protection as well as acting in an ombudsman function in freedom of information. The latter was introduced with the German Freedom of Information Act on 1 January 2006. In 2016, it became an independent federal agency in accordance with EU regulations.

Organization
Before the commencement of the German Freedom of Information Act, the title was "Federal Commissioner for Data Protection (BfD)".

The German Federal Government nominates him and the German Bundestag elects him. During his time in office, he receives remuneration in the amount commensurate with a federal official in salary group B 11. In this regard, his status is that of a public law official, but not however, that of a civil servant. The term of office is five years. He can be reelected once.

The Federal Commissioner's budget is accounted for in its own budgetary section. The necessary personnel and facilities are to be made available to him pursuant to legal regulations. Given his independent status positions at the Federal Commissioner are filled by himself exclusively.

Responsibilities
The Federal Commissioner is the German Federal supervisory authority in the meaning of Art. 51 of the General Data Protection Regulation (GDPR). According to Art. 52 GDPR the Federal Commissioner is a completely independent supervisory authority. His tasks and powers are mainly based on Art. 57 and 58 GDPR and the Federal Data Protection Act (Bundesdatenschutzgesetz). His legal position and the procedure of his establishment are subject to the provisions of the Federal Data Protection Act. His competence is limited to supervision of the entire public sector at federal level and of telecommunications and postal services providers. The public sector of the Laender as well as the remaining private sector is supervised by the Data Protection Supervisory Authorities of the Laender. The Federal Commissioner publishes an annual activity report (Art. 59 GDPR).

A right to refuse to give evidence is available to the Federal Commissioner in regard to persons and facts with which comes into contact in his capacity as Federal Commissioner (FDPA sec 13, para 5). He is also authorized to decide about his employees' refusal to give evidence.

List of commissioners 

 Hans Peter Bull (14 February 1978 to 16 May 1983)
 Reinhold Baumann (16 May 1983 to 9 June 1988)
 Alfred Einwag (9 June 1988 to 30 June 1993)
 Joachim Jacob (1 July 1993 to 17 December 2003)
 Peter Schaar (17 December 2003 to 16 December 2013)
 Andrea Voßhoff (19 December 2013 to 5 January 2019)
Ulrich Kelber ( 7 January 2019 to present)

See also 
 Information commissioner

References

External links
 

Federal law enforcement agencies of Germany
Federal authorities in Bonn
Data protection authorities